This article provides a list of all known sketches of The Honeymooners.

26 sketches were known to have aired in the 1951–52 season on DuMont's Cavalcade of Stars and two on The Ed Sullivan Show. Eight surviving episodes from Cavalcade have been released on DVD as of 2011. The two from The Ed Sullivan Show remain unreleased.

104 sketches were known to have aired between 1952 and 1957 on CBS' The Jackie Gleason Show. Known as the "Lost Episodes", most of them have been released on DVD as of 2002.

Lost episode boxed sets come with 4 volumes in each boxed set. Those were released in 2002. The remainder have not been released for various reasons, including: 1) Some are still lost or only in the hands of private collectors; 2) Some are incomplete or are in poor condition.

The "Classic 39" episodes of 1955–56 are not included in this list as they constitute a sitcom version of The Honeymooners.

Cavalcade of Stars: 1951–52
The following is a listing of "Honeymooners" sketches that aired during the 1951–52 season of Cavalcade of Stars on the DuMont Television Network. (*Except where noted.)

The Jackie Gleason Show: 1952–53
The following is a listing of "Honeymooners" sketches that aired during the first season of The Jackie Gleason Show on CBS.

The Jackie Gleason Show: 1953–54
The following is a listing of "Honeymooners" sketches that aired during the second season of The Jackie Gleason Show on CBS.

The Jackie Gleason Show: 1954–55
The following is a listing of "Honeymooners" sketches that aired during the third season of The Jackie Gleason Show on CBS.

The Honeymooners: 1955–56

The Jackie Gleason Show: 1956–57
The following is a listing of "Honeymooners" sketches that aired during the fourth season of The Jackie Gleason Show on CBS.

The Jackie Gleason Special: 1960
The following is a TV special.

The American Scene Magazine: 1962–66
The following is a listing of "Honeymooners" sketches that aired on The American Scene Magazine on CBS.

The Jackie Gleason Show: 1966–67
The following is a listing of "Honeymooners" sketches that aired on The Jackie Gleason Show  on CBS.

The Jackie Gleason Show: 1967–68

The Jackie Gleason Show: 1968–69

The Jackie Gleason Show: 1969–70

The Jackie Gleason Specials: 1970–85
The following is a listing of "Honeymooners" Specials.

References

Honeymooners, The
The Honeymooners